Silvestrii  may refer to:

 Filippo Silvestri (1873–1949), an Italian entomologist
 Silvestri

External links